Hugh Kelly may refer to:

 Hugh Kelly (poet) (1739–1777), Irish dramatist and poet
 Hughie Kelly (1923–2009), Scottish football player and manager
 Hugh Kelly (footballer, born 1919) (1919–1977), Northern Irish international football goalkeeper
 Hugh Craine Kelly (1848–1891), South Australian politician
 Hugh "Hug" Kelly, English rock drummer
 Col. Hugh A. Kelly (1888–1966), American engineer and architect

See also
 Hugh Kelley (disambiguation)